The 1984 24 Hours of Le Mans was the 52nd Grand Prix of Endurance, and took place on 16 – 17 June 1984.  It was also the third round of the 1984 World Endurance Championship.

The works Rothmans Porsche team boycotted the 1984 Le Mans race due to a disagreement between Porsche and the Automobile Club de l'Ouest (ACO) over the fuel regulations, meaning that drivers such as multiple winners Jacky Ickx and Derek Bell were absent from the race for the first time in many years. Porsche originally stated that its contracted drivers would not be allowed to race with any other team, however they did relent only two or three weeks before the race. 1983 co-winner Vern Schuppan was the only member of the Rothmans team to race in 1984, eagerly snapped up by Kremer Racing to drive a Porsche 956B he would share with fellow Australian,  Formula One World Champion Alan Jones, and experienced French driver Jean-Pierre Jarier. Surprisingly, Schuppan was the only regular Rothmans team driver to actually compete in the event with his 1983 co-winners Al Holbert and Hurley Haywood joining Ickx, Bell, Jochen Mass and Stefan Bellof (who would go on to win the 1984 World Endurance Championship) as non-starters.

1984 saw the largest ever influx of Australian drivers in the race, with not only defending race winner Schuppan and ex-World Champion Jones driving, but also star touring car driver Peter Brock and ex-F1 driver Larry Perkins in a 956 supplied by John Fitzpatrick Racing, Rusty French in the second Kremer Porsche 956 (French's drive was a reward from Porsche for winning the 1983 Australian GT Championship in a Porsche 935), Allan Grice in a Charles Ivey Racing 956, and regular Group C2 competitor Neil Crang in a Cosworth DFL powered Spice-Tiga Racing Tiga GC84.

Jaguar made its first official appearance at Le Mans for the first time since 1959 when Bob Tullius' Group 44 team brought over its two Jaguar XJR-5's powered by 6.0 litre Jaguar V12 engines from America. Group 44 racing, with the full backing of Jaguar, would compete in the IMSA GTP class. Before the decision to enter the race had been made, Jaguar had been concerned about the competitiveness of the XJR-5's against the turbocharged Porsche's and Ferrari powered Lancia's, especially with regard to top speed on the 6 km (3.7 mi) Mulsanne Straight. But those fears were put to rest when the  cars were clocked at over  during the 24 Hours of Daytona in February.

Reinhold Joest's privately entered 956 driven by Frenchman Henri Pescarolo and West German Klaus Ludwig won the race in the #7 Porsche 956B. For Pescarolo it was his fourth and last win at Le Mans, while for Ludwig it was his second win. After starting 3rd on the grid, the pair were only in 30th place after the first hour after pitting twice in the first 5 laps to fix a minor fuel feed problem after which the car ran almost faultlessly. The Porsche 956 dominated the final standings, taking the top seven places. The first non-Porsche 956 to finish was the Martini Racing Lancia LC2 of Bob Wollek and Alessandro Nannini. Wollek set the pole for the race with a 3:17.11 (248.873 km/h - 154.642 mp/h), some 11 seconds faster than Ludwig in the fastest Porsche. Formula 2 ace Nannini would set the races fastest lap and new lap record with a time of 3:28.90 (234.818 km/h - 145.908 mp/h) on lap 261, a time that would have been good enough for 5th place on the starting grid.

During the race, a French marshal, Jacky Loiseau (42) was killed when British driver John Sheldon crashed massively in the Aston Martin powered Nimrod NRA/C2 at the flat out right-hand kink on the Mulsanne Straight, a crash that also involved the second Aston Martin Nimrod of American driver Drake Olson, who hit some of the strewn bodywork from Sheldon's Nimrod that had caught fire and crashed as well. He was unhurt. Another marshal, Andre-Guy Lefebvre (48) was seriously injured, but survived. Sheldon survived the  crash, but he was severely burned, and the Nimrod's explosive impact against the Armco barriers was so violent, that some of the trees next to the track where the impact took place had been set on fire. The race was not stopped immediately, only that section of the straight was under caution, to protect the marshals and firefighters cleaning up the accident. Soon after, four pace cars were brought out under a full course caution, which lasted for 1 hour.

Official results

† - The #16 GTi Engineering Porsche was disqualified during the race for receiving technical assistance while still on the track.

Statistics
 Pole Position - Bob Wollek, #4 Martini Lancia - 3:17.11
 Fastest Lap - Alessandro Nannini, #4 Martini Lancia - 3:28.90
 Distance - 
 Average Speed -

Notes

References

 
 

24 Hours of Le Mans races
Le Mans
Le Mans
Le Mans